Safecast is an international, volunteer-centered organization devoted to open citizen science for environmental monitoring. Safecast was established by Sean Bonner, Pieter Franken, and Joi Ito shortly after the Fukushima Daiichi nuclear disaster in Japan, following the Tōhoku earthquake on 11 March 2011 and manages a global open data network for ionizing radiation and air quality monitoring.

The Safecast team, with help of International Medcom, Tokyo hackerspace, and other volunteers, has designed various devices for radiation mapping. Haiyan Zhang developed a widely used interactive map of radiation levels around Japan, and was a mapping consultant in the formative phase of Safecast. The Geiger counter-like devices developed include the bGeigie and bGeigie Nano for mobile applications (carborne and walking measurements) as well as fixed stations called Pointcast. Despite being a citizen science project, professional quality and scientific grade data was sought from the onset, and the methodology and tool-sets Safecast developed and deployed are cited in scientific literature and by governments.

All data are collected via the Safecast API and are presented on the publicly available interactive Safecast Tile Map with global coverage.

Safecast later expanded to offer air quality sensors (PM1, PM2.5, PM10 µg/m³ particulate matter) which also report to open crowdsourced maps.

As of 2020 the project has made 120 million observations and calculated mean dose rates for 330 cities around the world.

bGeigie Nano
Safecast bGeigie Nano is a portable radiation detector equipped with a Geiger–Müller tube type detector, built-in GPS and logging to microSD card.

The bGeigie Nano is available as a kit, so the user needs to learn how to solder in order to build it from the supplied parts. Until November 2020 the kit could be purchased from the Kithub product page. The device was developed in collaboration with International Medcom Inc. and shares some parts with their Inspector Alert detector. According to the Safecast Github page "bGeigie Nano is a lighter version of the bGeigie Mini using an Arduino Fio, a GpsBee, an OpenLog and an Inspector Alert geiger counter. The aim is to make everything fit in a Pelican Micro Case 1040".

The final version of the bGeigie is placed inside the smaller Pelican Micro Case 1010. It features the LND 7317 pancake Geiger-Mueller tube type detector, a GPS receiver and is expandable with a Bluetooth module. The mode switch offers choice between geotagged radiation logging (data saved to microSD card) and measuring without GPS - showing also Bq/m2 (137Cs) values. Inside the case the unit is calibrated for gamma radiation. The main unit taken out of its case will additionally do α- and β-detection for careful use as a surface contamination spot meter.

According to the KitHub page Safecast devices are also used by the following institutions:  
 International Atomic Energy Agency (IAEA)
 Institute for Radiological Protection and Nuclear Safety / Institut de radioprotection et de sûreté nucléaire (IRSN), France
 Natural Resources Defense Council (NRDC), United States
 Czech National Radiation Protection Institute / Státní ústav radiační ochrany (SÚRO), Czech Republic

Slovenian NGO IRNAS - Institute for development of advanced applied systems Rače / Inštitut za razvoj naprednih aplikativnih sistemov Rače performs monitoring in Slovenia  with their one bGeigie

2022 Russian invasion of Ukraine and the “bGeigies for Ukraine” initiative

Following the 2022 Russian invasion of Ukraine and especially the Capture of Chernobyl and the activities of the Russian forces in the contaminated areas of the Chernobyl Exclusion Zone including digging trenches or using the highly contaminated Red Forest as a route for their convoys initiated a request for a new radiation mapping of the region after the withdrawal of Russian troops.

On July 20, 2022 Safecast announced the “bGeigies4Ukraine” initiative (#bgeigies4ukraine) - joint initiative of:

 Safecast, Japan
 SaveDnipro, Ukraine
 National Radiation Protection Institute / Státní ústav radiační ochrany (SÚRO), Czech Republic
 Chornobyl Radiation Ecological Biosphere Reserve, Ukraine

SÚRO provided 10 bGeigie Nano dectectors and following radiation monitoring led to over 300,000 data points gathered as of September 17, 2022.

All the data gathered within #bgeigies4ukraine initiative the are part of the interactive Safecast Map and the dataset available under CC0 license.

Discontinuation of bGeigie Nano kit production, development of alternatives

In November 2020 KitHub announced in their email newsletter stopping the production of the bGeigie Nano kits after 5 years. Two devices are currently under development that could replace bGeigie Nano in the future (the existing devices will remain in service).

bGeigie Zen by Safecast

In April 2021 Safecast announced development of new device called bGeigie Zen.

BGeigie Zen is based on original bGeigie but uses a new sensor board, the SafePulse and M5Stack modular IoT platform. The presented prototype was built in bigger Pelican 1015 case.

CzechRad by SÚRO

CzechRad is a direct bGeigie Nano alternative in development. The device uses same LND 7317 (USA) Geiger tube as bGeigie Nano, same Pelican 1010 plastic case and same output data format (LOG files). Compared to bGeigie, CzechRad is not assembled from several commercial modules but instead uses brand new custom designed boards - mainboard using SAMD21G processor (ARM M0+), GPS module by uBlox. The electronic boards will be manufactured by Tesla (Czechoslovak company). While bGeigie Nano uses OLED display in inverse mode (white text on black), the CzechRad has standard monochrome LCD display, which is better readable in daylight.

References

External links

 
 bGeigie Nano radiation detector homepage
 Brown, Azby; Baumont Genevieve; Kuča, Petr; Helebrant, Jan - Citizen-based radiation measurement in Europe: Supporting informed decisions regarding radiation exposure for emergencies as well as in daily life. RICOMET2016 Conference poster. Available online as PDF.
 Brown, Azby; Franken, Pieter; Bonner, Sean; Dolezal, Nick; Moross, Joe - Safecast: successful citizen-science for radiation measurement and communication after Fukushima - Published 6 June 2016 • © 2016 IOP Publishing Ltd Journal of Radiological Protection, Volume 36, Number 2, available online.

Ionising radiation detectors
Fukushima Daiichi nuclear disaster
2011 Tōhoku earthquake and tsunami
Emergency organizations
Radiation protection organizations
Emergency management software
Citizen science
Crowdsourcing